Sayliobod (formerly Algha) is a jamoat in Tajikistan. It is located in Lakhsh District, one of the Districts of Republican Subordination. The jamoat has a total population of 4,467 (2015). It consists of five villages, including Mehrobod (the seat), Domanakuh, Gulzoron, Sebiston and Tojvaron

References

Populated places in Districts of Republican Subordination
Jamoats of Tajikistan